The 1928 Appalachian Normal football team represented Appalachian State Normal School—now known as Appalachian State University—in the 1928 college football season. This was the first season that the school fielded a football team. Appalachian Normal was led by head coach Graydon Eggers and played their home games at College Field in Boone, North Carolina.

Schedule

References

Appalachian Normal
Appalachian State Mountaineers football seasons
Appalachian Normal football